The following is a list of the 17 cantons of the Haute-Savoie department, in France, following the French canton reorganisation which came into effect in March 2015:

Annecy-1
Annecy-2
Annecy-3
Annecy-4
Annemasse
Bonneville
Cluses
Évian-les-Bains
Faverges
Gaillard
Le Mont-Blanc
La Roche-sur-Foron
Rumilly
Saint-Julien-en-Genevois
Sallanches
Sciez
Thonon-les-Bains

References